Staraya Toyda is a rural locality (a selo) and the administrative center of Starotoydenskoye Rural Settlement, Anninsky District, Voronezh Oblast, Russia. The population was 679 as of 2010. There are 15 streets.

Geography 
Staraya Toyda is located 26 km south of Anna (the district's administrative centre) by road. Verkhnyaya Toyda is the nearest rural locality.

References 

Rural localities in Anninsky District